The Archbishop of Westminster heads the Roman Catholic Diocese of Westminster, in England. The incumbent is the metropolitan of the Province of Westminster, chief metropolitan of England and Wales and, as a matter of custom, is elected president of the Catholic Bishops' Conference of England and Wales, and therefore de facto spokesman of the Catholic Church in England and Wales. All previous archbishops of Westminster have become cardinals.
Although all the bishops of the restored diocesan episcopacy took new titles, like that of Westminster, they saw themselves in continuity with the pre-Reformation Church and post-Reformation vicars apostolic and titular bishops. Westminster, in particular, saw itself as the continuity of Canterbury, hence the similarity of the coats of arms of the two sees, with Westminster believing it has more right to it since it features the pallium, a distinctly Catholic symbol of communion with the Holy See.

History
With Catholic emancipation, the gradual abolition of the legal restrictions on the activities of Catholics in England and Wales in the early 19th century, Rome on its own ("not by Concordat with the British government nor conversations with the Anglican Church") decided to fill the partial vacuum, which Queen Elizabeth I had created, by restoring Catholic dioceses on a regular historical pattern and replacing existing titular bishops or vicars apostolic with diocesan ones. Thus Pope Pius IX issued the bull Universalis Ecclesiae of 29 September 1850 by which thirteen new dioceses were created. Although these dioceses could not formally claim pre-Elizabethan territorial dioceses (owing to the Roman Catholic Relief Act 1829), they did claim validity and continuity with the pre-Elizabethan Church.

Historian and descendant of recusants, Paul Johnson, claims that as early as 1718, only 30 years after the Glorious Revolution, Catholics could take heart when Parliament repealed the Schism Act, the Occasional Conformity Act and the Act for Quieting and Establishing Corporations, which allowed Dissenters to hold certain offices. Although these repeals at the time only benefited Dissenters, their rescission and abolition suggested reform was in the air and on Parliament's mind.

Then in 1727, in the wake of the repeal of the annual Indemnity Acts, which relieved Dissenters of most of their civil disabilities (making it no longer possible, for example, to enforce by law the attendance of anyone at church on Sunday), Catholics, especially non-aristocratic Catholics, could slowly start to creep out into the open again, long before the Catholic Emancipation of 1832. As a result of the 1727 Act, Christianity in England (Anglican, Dissenters, Catholic, etc.) also ceased to be a "compulsory society". Still, Catholics had to wait another 95 years before being given full civil and religious rights. Nevertheless, the gains of the Dissenters a century earlier were a significant step towards eliminating Catholic disabilities later.

The Ecclesiastical Titles Act had already been proposed by the British Parliament and was passed in 1851 as an anti-Catholic measure precisely to prevent any newly created Catholic dioceses from taking existing Anglican diocesan names, forbidding the wearing of (Anglican) clerical dress or setting bells in Catholic places of worship. It was repealed by Gladstone in 1871 but, even after, new Catholic Dioceses didn't take existing (Anglican) diocesan names.

One of these newly restored dioceses was the Diocese of Westminster, the sole Metropolitan See at that time. However, under Pope Pius X, on 28 October 1911, the provinces of Liverpool and Birmingham were created, and Westminster retained as suffragan dioceses only Northampton, Nottingham, Portsmouth and Southwark. These increased when under Pope Benedict XV a bull of 20 July 1917, fixed the seat of a new diocese corresponding to the County of Essex, detached now from Westminster, at Brentwood, making it a suffragan of Westminster.

During the pontificate of Pope Paul VI, on 28 May 1965, the Province of Southwark was erected, with as its suffragans Portsmouth, detached from Westminster, Plymouth, detached from Birmingham, and the diocese of Arundel and Brighton erected in the counties of Sussex and Surrey with territory taken from the diocese of Southwark. Westminster retained as suffragan dioceses only Northampton, Nottingham and Brentwood. Subsequently these were joined by a new diocese of East Anglia, elected with territory from the Northampton diocese in the counties of Cambridge, Norfolk and Suffolk by Paul VI on 13 March 1976.

The previous Catholic jurisdiction of the London area was headed by the Vicar Apostolic of the London District or titular bishop, appointed by the pope.

Current situation
The see is in the City of Westminster, the Archbishop's cathedra or seat is located at the Metropolitan Cathedral Church of the "Most Precious Holy Blood, Saint Mary, Saint Joseph and Saint Peter", usually referred to as Westminster Cathedral, which is set back from Victoria Street.

The Archbishop's residence is Archbishop's House, Ambrosden Avenue, London.

Vincent Cardinal Nichols was installed as the 11th archbishop on 21 May 2009. He was elevated to cardinal on 22 February 2014, becoming the 43rd English cardinal since the 12th century.

Title of primate
Among the old European Catholic sees, the Archbishop of Westminster is referred to as the Primate of England and Wales. However, in the United Kingdom, this is not legally correct, since the title is formally claimed only by the archbishops of the established Church of England, and is applied to the Archbishop of York as "Primate of England", and the Archbishop of Canterbury, as "Primate of All England". In global Catholicism, however, the last time there was an elected Catholic primate of England in Great Britain, accepted by the state, was prior to the Elizabethan phase of the Reformation. However, the papal bull  Si qua est  of 1911, which separated the provinces of Birmingham and Liverpool from Westminster, included the provision:

Which translates into:

List of archbishops

See also
Religion in the United Kingdom
Catholic Church in Great Britain
Lists of office-holders

References

Catholic Church in England and Wales
 
Westminster
Roman Catholic Diocese of Westminster
1850 establishments in England